Municipalities in Sweden are in some rare cases divided into smaller districts  or urban districts, and are sometimes assigned administrative boards responsible for certain areas of governance in their respective areas.  These districts are not specified by national Swedish law, but rather are created by individual municipalities, and thus the Swedish names of these districts vary greatly from municipality to municipality, including kommundelar, stadsdelar, stadsdelområden, primärområden, or stadsdelsnämndsområden.  The degree of administrative autonomy of these districts similarly varies greatly, but is normally very limited.

On 1 January 2016 a new form of division of Sweden was introduced. This division is called Districts or Registration districts, in Swedish Distrikt. These are used for certain administrative purposes by some national authorities, such as land ownership and statistics. This is not the same as the urban districts which are divisions held by some municipalities.

Stockholm

Overview
Stockholm consists of 26 municipalities (boroughs), each municipality is divided into smaller subdivisions/districts.

Stockholm Municipality uses the English term "district" (Swedish: stadsdelområde) to describe these subdivisions.

The districts were first created in 1997 to facilitate the efficiency of local government in Stockholm.  The number of districts was reduced from 24 to 18 the following year, and reduced again to the current 14 in 2007.  Since the establishment of these districts, certain administrative tasks, such as school administration were re-centralized.

Each district has its own district administration, led by a district council, which is responsible for certain areas of municipal governance within their district, including pre-school education, park maintenance, local economic initiatives, elderly services, financial counseling, and refugee reception services.  Individual district councils have no power over city planning or tax policy, both of which are retained by the central city council.

The councilors that serve on these district councils are often part-time politicians, also holding other employment.  They are preferably residents of the district whose council they serve upon.  The central city council itself is responsible for setting the budget, goals, and responsibilities of the district councils.  The city council also appoints the members of each district council, so the political makeup of the district council resembles that of the central city council, not necessarily that of the district.  The member of the district council are not elected in any fashion by the residents of the district in question.

Stockholm's 14 districts are sometimes divided into smaller parts for statistical purposes, however these smaller districts have no administrative function in the city's governance.

Boroughs
Stockholm has 26 municipalities (boroughs):

 Botkyrka
 Danderyd
 Ekerö
 Haninge
 Huddinge
 Järfälla
 Lidingö
 Nacka
 Norrtälje
 Nykvarn
 Nynäshamn
 Österåker
 Salem
 Sigtuna
 Södertälje
 Sollentuna
 Solna
 Stockholm
 Sundbyberg
 Täby
 Tyresö
 Upplands Väsby
 Upplands-Bro
 Vallentuna
 Värmdö
 Vaxholm

Districts
Stockholm municipality has 14 districts as of the administrative changes made in 2007:

 Älvsjö
 Bromma
 Enskede-Årsta-Vantör
 Farsta
 Hägersten-Liljeholmen
 Hässelby-Vällingby
 Kungsholmen
 Norrmalm
 Östermalm
 Rinkeby-Kista
 Skärholmen
 Skarpnäck
 Södermalm
 Spånga-Tensta

Gothenburg

Overview
Gothenburg Municipality (Göteborgs stad) is also divided into subdivisions which it refers to as "districts" in English, though as with Stockholm's districts, they are often referred to as boroughs in unofficial contexts.  The Swedish term used by the city council is stadsdelsnämndsområden (literally "city-part committee area").  These districts were created in 1990.  Just like in Stockholm, these districts each have a local governing body which Gothenburg calls "district committees."  These committees serve a nearly identical function to Stockholm's district councils, including recreation, local economic issues and social services, and the lower levels of the education system, and like Stockholm's councils, these committees are appointed by the centralized city council.

Gothenburg is divided into 21 districts, each with a district committee.  These 21 districts can be further divided into 94 subdivisions (called primärområden/primary areas) which exist only for statistical and organizational purposes, and serve no administrative function.

Districts
The 21 districts of Gothenburg and the primärområden enclosed within each:

 Askim
 Askim
 Hovås
 Billdal
 Backa
 Backa
 Brunnsbo
 Skogome
 Skälltorp
 Bergsjön
 Västra Bergsjön
 Östra Bergsjön
 Biskopsgården
 Norra Biskopsgården
 Södra Biskopsgården
 Jättesten
 Svartedalen
 Länsmansgården
 Centrum
 Guldheden
 Heden
 Johanneberg
 Krokslätt
 Landala
 Stampen
 Vasastaden
 Lorensberg
 Inom Vallgraven

 Frölunda
 Järnbrott
 Tofta
 Ruddalen
 Frölunda Torg
 Gunnared
 Lövgärdet
 Rannebergen
 Gårdstensbergen
 Angereds Centrum
 Härlanda
 Härlanda
 Kålltorp
 Torpa
 Björkekärr
 Högsbo
 Kaverös
 Flatås
 Högsbohöjd
 Högsbotorp
 Högsbo
 Kortedala
 Gamlestaden
 Utby
 Södra Kortedala
 Norra Kortedala
 Kärra-Rödbo
 Kärra
 Rödbo

 Linnéstaden
 Masthugget
 Änggården
 Haga
 Annedal
 Olivedal
 Lundby
 Sannegården
 Brämaregården
 Kvillebäcken
 Slättadamm
 Kärrdalen
 Lärjedalen
 Hammarkullen
 Hjällbo
 Eriksbo
 Agnesberg
 Linnarhult
 Gunnilse
 Bergum
 Majorna
 Kungsladugård
 Sanna
 Majorna
 Stigberget
 Styrsö
 Styrsö

 Torslanda
 Hjuvik
 Nolered
 Björlanda
 Arendal
 Tuve-Säve
 Tuve
 Säve
 Tynnered
 Bratthammar
 Guldringen
 Skattegården
 Ängås
 Önnered
 Grevegården
 Näset
 Kannebäck
 Älvsborg
 Fiskebäck
 Långedrag
 Hagen
 Grimmered
 Örgryte
 Olskroken
 Redbergslid
 Bagaregården
 Kallebäck
 Skår
 Överås
 Kärralund
 Lunden

Malmö

Overview
Malmö Municipality (Malmö stad) is divided into five districts. These districts each have a board or council called a stadsdelsfullmäktige, each consisting of eleven members, which are responsible for various local administrative tasks.  In Malmö, the district councils are also responsible for assisting members of the community in contacting their politicians or navigating their way through government agencies.

Districts
These are the five districts of Malmö:
 Väster
 Innerstaden
 Norr
 Söder
 Öster

Other examples
Other smaller municipalities in Sweden also use municipal subdivisions for official purposes, however these are not always administrative.  For example, Strängnäs Municipality uses district councils (kommundelsråd) which serve a purely advisory function and have no administrative power.

Borås Municipality is divided into ten districts (kommundelar), each with a district council (kommundelsnnämd) responsible for pre-school and primary school, recreational services, and services for the elderly.

Torshälla is a region inside Eskilstuna Municipality which has withheld a degree of autonomy since merging with Eskilstuna, including their own city council (Torshälla stads nämd).

Other municipalities that use districts for advisory or administrative purposes include Huddinge, Kalmar, Köping, Södertälje, Umeå and Västerås.

See also
 Government of Sweden
 Swedish municipal assemblies
 Politics of Sweden

References

External links
 City of Stockholm (English)
 City of Stockholm: About Stockholm (Swedish)

Subdivisions of Sweden